Cedar Township is a township in Greene County, Iowa, USA.

History
Cedar Township was established in 1867.

References

Townships in Greene County, Iowa
Townships in Iowa
1867 establishments in Iowa
Populated places established in 1867